Mottram St Andrew  is a village and civil parish in Cheshire, England. At the 2011 census, it had a population of 493. An affluent village in the Cheshire countryside, it is in the Golden Triangle of Alderley Edge, Prestbury and Wilmslow, 15 miles from Manchester. Mottram Hall is a hotel and golfing centre; Lower Manor is the former home of the Mottershead family.

Sportsmen who have lived in the area include footballers Peter Crouch, Wayne Rooney, Owen Hargreaves, Mark Hughes, Carlos Tevez, Benjamin Mendy and Mario Balotelli, cricketer Andrew Flintoff, and snooker player Alex Higgins.

Rostrum was founded under the Yew Tree at Greendale Farm, Mottram St Andrew on 21 July 1923.

See also

Listed buildings in Mottram St Andrew

References

External links

Villages in Cheshire
Civil parishes in Cheshire